Chiriet-Lunga is a commune and village in the Gagauz Autonomous Territorial Unit of the Republic of Moldova.  The 2004 census listed the commune as having a population of 2,498 people.   Gagauz total 2,312. Minorities included 54 Moldovans, 35 Russians, 32 Ukrainians, 37 Bulgarians and 18 Roma.

Its geographical coordinates are 46° 12' 33" North, 28° 56' 39" East.

Notable people
People from Chiriet-Lunga include:
 Dmitri Todoroglo, Moldovan Minister of Agriculture and Food Industry, 2001–2005

References

Chiriet-Lunga